David Anderson (born 23 December 1965) is a British boxer. He competed in the men's featherweight event at the 1988 Summer Olympics.

Anderson won the 1988 Amateur Boxing Association British featherweight title, when boxing out of the Bellahouston BC.

References

External links
 

1965 births
Living people
Scottish male boxers
British male boxers
Olympic boxers of Great Britain
Boxers at the 1988 Summer Olympics
Boxers from Glasgow
Commonwealth Games medallists in boxing
Commonwealth Games bronze medallists for Scotland
Boxers at the 1990 Commonwealth Games
Featherweight boxers
Medallists at the 1990 Commonwealth Games